The 1991–92 Argentine Primera B Nacional was the sixth season of second division professional of football in Argentina. A total of 22 teams competed; the champion and runner-up were promoted to Argentine Primera División.

Club information

Standings
Lanús was declared champion and was automatically promoted to Primera División, and the teams placed 2nd to 10th qualified for the Second Promotion Playoff.

Second Promotion Playoff
The Second Promotion Playoff or Torneo Reducido was played by the teams placed 2nd to 10th in the overall standings: Almirante Brown (2nd), who entered in the Semifinals, Colón (3rd), who entered in the Second Round, San Martín (T) (4th), Douglas Haig (5th), Nueva Chicago (6th), Instituto (7th), Atlético Tucumán (8th), Chaco For Ever (9th) and Talleres (RE) (10th), the champion of Primera B Metropolitana: Ituzaingó, and Arsenal and Gimnasia y Tiro, both winners of Zonales Noroeste y Sureste from Torneo del Interior entered in the First Round.

Bracket

1: Qualified because of sport advantage.
Note: The team in the first line plays at home the second leg.

Relegation

Note: Clubs with indirect affiliation with AFA are relegated to their respective league of his province according to the Argentine football league system, while clubs directly affiliated face relegation to Primera B Metropolitana. Clubs with direct affiliation are all from Greater Buenos Aires, with the exception of Newell's, Rosario Central, Central Córdoba and Argentino de Rosario, all from Rosario, and Unión and Colón from Santa Fe.

Relegation Playoff Matches
Each tie was played on a home-and-away two-legged basis, but if the first match was won by the team of Primera B Nacional (who also played the first leg at home), there was no need to play the second. If instead, the team from the Regional leagues wins the first leg, the second leg must be played, leg that, if its won by the team of Primera B Nacional, a third leg must be played, if the third leg finishes in a tie, the team from Primera B Nacional remains on it.
This season, Racing (C) had to defend their spot in Primera B Nacional against General Paz Juniors, from the Liga Cordobesa de fútbol, and Atlético de Rafaela had to defend their spot in Primera B Nacional against 9 de Julio (R), from the Liga Rafaelina de fútbol.

Racing (C) remains in Primera B Nacional.

Atletico de Rafaela remains in Primera B Nacional.

See also
1991–92 in Argentine football

References

External links

Primera B Nacional seasons
Prim
1991 in South American football leagues
1992 in South American football leagues